Senad Lupić (born 28 March 1966) is a Bosnian retired footballer.

Club career
During his club career he first played for suburb club NK Polet Omeragići where he was born and soon after he was spotted by town club FK Tekstilac Derventa. Later after try out in Germany with NK Dinamo Zagreb he moved to FK Kozara Gradiška, NK Iskra Bugojno, FK Borac Banja Luka and finally in FC Gueugnon. Reference

He is famous for scoring the winning goal in 1988 Yugoslav Cup final in which FK Borac Banja Luka played against FK Crvena Zvezda and won 1:0.

External links
YouTube.

1960 births
Living people
People from Derventa
Association football forwards
Yugoslav footballers
FK Kozara Gradiška players
NK Iskra Bugojno players
FK Borac Banja Luka players
FC Gueugnon players
Yugoslav First League players
Ligue 2 players
Yugoslav expatriate footballers
Expatriate footballers in France
Yugoslav expatriate sportspeople in France
FK Sarajevo players